The Sorrows of Young Werther is a 1774 epistolary novel by Johann Wolfgang Goethe, which appeared as a revised edition in 1787. It was one of the main novels in the Sturm und Drang period in German literature, and influenced the later Romantic movement. Goethe, aged 24 at the time, finished Werther in five and a half weeks of intensive writing in January to March 1774. It instantly placed him among the foremost international literary celebrities and was among the best known of his works.

Plot summary

Most of The Sorrows of Young Werther, a story about a young man's extreme response to unrequited love, is presented as a collection of letters written by Werther, a young artist of a sensitive and passionate temperament, to his friend Wilhelm. There he meets Charlotte, a beautiful young girl who takes care of her siblings after the death of their mother. Werther falls in love with Charlotte despite knowing beforehand that she is engaged to a man named Albert, eleven years her senior.

Despite the pain it causes him, Werther spends the next few months cultivating a close friendship with them both. His sorrow eventually becomes so unbearable that he is forced to leave Wahlheim for Weimar, where he makes the acquaintance of Fräulein von B. He suffers great embarrassment when he forgetfully visits a friend and unexpectedly has to face there the weekly gathering of the entire aristocratic set. He is not tolerated and asked to leave since he is not a nobleman. He then returns to Wahlheim, where he suffers still more than before, partly because Charlotte and Albert are now married. Every day becomes a torturing reminder that Charlotte will never be able to requite his love. She, out of pity for her friend and respect for her husband, decides that Werther must not visit her so frequently. He visits her one final time, and they are both overcome with emotion after he recites to her a passage of his own translation of Ossian.

Even before that incident, Werther had hinted at the idea that one member of the love triangle – Charlotte, Albert or Werther himself – had to die to resolve the situation. Unable to hurt anyone else or seriously consider murder, Werther sees no other choice but to take his own life. After composing a farewell letter to be found after his death, he writes to Albert asking for his two pistols, on the pretext that he is going "on a journey". Charlotte receives the request with great emotion and sends the pistols. Werther then shoots himself in the head, but does not die until twelve hours later. He is buried between two linden trees that he had mentioned frequently in his letters. The funeral is not attended by any clergy, or by Albert or Charlotte. The book ends with an intimation that Charlotte may die of a broken heart: "I shall say nothing of...Charlotte's grief. ... Charlotte's life was despaired of."

Effect on Goethe

Werther was one of Goethe's few works aligned with the aesthetic, social and philosophical ideals that pervaded the German proto-Romantic movement known as Sturm und Drang, before he and Friedrich von Schiller moved into Weimar Classicism. The novel was published anonymously, and Goethe distanced himself from it in his later years, regretting the fame it had brought him and the consequent attention to his own youthful love of Charlotte Buff, then already engaged to Johann Christian Kestner. Although he wrote Werther at the age of 24, it was all for which some of his visitors in his old age knew him. Goethe had changed his views of literature radically by then, even denouncing the Romantic movement as "everything that is sick."

Goethe described the powerful impact the book had on him, writing that even if Werther had been a brother of his whom he had killed, he could not have been more haunted by his vengeful ghost. Yet, Goethe substantially reworked the book for the 1787 edition and acknowledged the great personal and emotional influence that The Sorrows of Young Werther could exert on forlorn young lovers who discovered it. As he commented to his secretary in 1821, "It must be bad, if not everybody was to have a time in his life, when he felt as though Werther had been written exclusively for him." Even fifty years after the book's publication, Goethe wrote in a conversation with Johann Peter Eckermann about the emotional turmoil he had gone through while writing the book: "That was a creation which I, like the pelican, fed with the blood of my own heart."

Cultural impact
The Sorrows of Young Werther turned Goethe, previously an unknown author, into a literary celebrity almost overnight. Napoleon Bonaparte considered it one of the great works of European literature, having written a Goethe-inspired soliloquy in his youth and carried Werther with him on his campaigning to Egypt. It also started the phenomenon known as "Werther Fever," which caused young men throughout Europe to dress in the clothing style described for Werther in the novel. Items of merchandising such as prints, decorated Meissen porcelain and even a perfume were produced. Thomas Carlyle coined an epithet, "Wertherism", to describe the self-indulgency of the age that the phenomenon represented.

The book reputedly also led to some of the first known examples of copycat suicide. The men were often dressed in the same clothing "as Goethe's description of Werther and using similar pistols." Often the book was found at the scene of the suicide. Rüdiger Safranski, a modern biographer of Goethe, dismisses the Werther Effect "as only a persistent rumor." Nonetheless, this aspect of "Werther Fever" was watched with concern by the authorities – both the novel and the Werther clothing style were banned in Leipzig in 1775; the novel was also banned in Denmark and Italy. It was also watched with fascination by fellow authors. One of these, Friedrich Nicolai, decided to create a satirical piece with a happy ending, entitled Die Freuden des jungen Werthers ("The Joys of Young Werther"), in which Albert, having realized what Werther is up to, loaded chicken's blood into the pistol, thereby foiling Werther's suicide, and happily concedes Charlotte to him. After some initial difficulties, Werther sheds his passionate youthful side and reintegrates himself into society as a respectable citizen.

Goethe, however, was not pleased with the "Freuden" and started a literary war with Nicolai that lasted all his life, writing a poem titled "Nicolai auf Werthers Grabe" ("Nicolai on Werther's grave"), in which Nicolai (here a passing nameless pedestrian) defecates on Werther's grave, so desecrating the memory of a Werther from which Goethe had distanced himself in the meantime, as he had from the Sturm und Drang. This argument was continued in his collection of short and critical poems the Xenien  and his play Faust.

Alternative versions and appearances

Goethe's work was the basis for the 1892 opera Werther by Jules Massenet.
In Mary Shelley's Frankenstein, Frankenstein's monster finds the book in a leather portmanteau, along with two others – Plutarch's Lives of the Noble Greeks and Romans, and Milton's Paradise Lost. He sees Werther's case as similar to his own, of one rejected by those he loved.
The book influenced Ugo Foscolo's The Last Letters of Jacopo Ortis, which tells of a young man who commits suicide, out of desperation caused not only by love, but by the political situation of Italy before Italian unification. This is taken to be the first Italian epistolary novel.
Thomas Carlyle, who incidentally translated Goethe's novel Wilhelm Meister into English, frequently refers to and parodies Werther's relationship in his 1836 novel Sartor Resartus.
The statistician Karl Pearson's first book was The New Werther.
William Makepeace Thackeray wrote a poem satirizing Goethe's story entitled "Sorrows of Werther".
Thomas Mann's 1939 novel Lotte in Weimar recounts a fictional reunion between Goethe and his youthful passion, Charlotte Buff as elderlies.
A 2002 episode of the Canadian television series History Bites titled "Love & Death" is about the cultural impact of Werther, with Bob Bainborough satirically portraying Goethe in 1780 as a guest on a talk show spoofing The Rosie O'Donnell Show.  Goethe wants to discuss his newest work, an adaptation of Iphigenia in Tauris, but is annoyed by having to deal with obsessive fans of Werther.
Ulrich Plenzdorf, a GDR poet, wrote a satirical novel (and play) called Die neuen Leiden des jungen W. ("The New Sorrows of Young W."), transposing the events into an East German setting, with the protagonist as an ineffectual teenager rebelling against the system.
In William Hill Brown's The Power of Sympathy, the novel appears next to Harrington's unsealed suicide note.
The 2010 German film Goethe! is a fictional account of the relations between the young Goethe, Charlotte Buff and her fiancé Kestner, which at times draws on that of Werther, Charlotte and Albert.
The 2014 novel The Sorrows of Young Mike by John Zelazny is a loosely autobiographical parody of Goethe's novel.
In the 2015 game, The Witcher 3: Wild Hunts Blood and Wine expansion pack, there is a treasure hunt called "The Suffering of Young Francois", where a man named François seeks help from a witch to make a woman named Charlotte, who is engaged with Albert, fall in love with him. The witch tricked François, making a Spriggan appear in the state and murder everyone. When François learns of this, he hangs himself.
 The story is read in the first episode of the 2019 series Rookie Historian Goo Hae-ryung.
 The story is read to the dragon Temeraire by Captain William Laurence in Naomi Novik’s novel Black Powder War, the third book in the Temeraire series.

Translations
.
; originally publ. by CT Brainard.
.
; originally publ. by Random House.
.
.
The Hebrew translation  was popular among youths in the Zionist communities in British Mandate of Palestine in the 1930s and 1940s and was blamed for the suicide of several young men considered to have emulated Werther.

See also

William Render

References

Further reading
.
Herold, J. Christopher (1963). The Age of Napoleon. American Heritage Inc.

External links

 
 
Free Audiobook from LibriVox 
The Sorrows of Young Werther Free Audio in English
What Werther Went Through (21st-century update, published in "real-time" online and via personalised emails)
William Makepeace Thackeray's poem "Sorrows of Werther"

 
Fictional suicides
1774 novels
Epistolary novels
Künstlerroman
Novels about artists
Novels by Johann Wolfgang von Goethe
Sturm und Drang
Sentimental novels
Fiction about suicide
Wetzlar
18th-century German novels
German novels adapted into films
Literature controversies